The Protestant church of Gytsjerk or Saint Martin's church is a religious building in Gytsjerk, Netherlands, one of the numerous medieval churches in Friesland.

It is a late 12th century Romanesque church with a 19th-century facade. Over time the church was several times changed/converted but the North wall, South wall and  choir show still beautiful signs of the Romanesque tuffstone church. The church is located on the Canterlandseweg 63 and was once a Roman Catholic church dedicated to Saint Martin but became a Protestant church after the protestant reformation. It is listed as a Rijksmonument, number 35654 and is rated with a very high historical value.

References

Tytsjerksteradiel
Gytsjerk
Rijksmonuments in Friesland
Romanesque architecture in the Netherlands
Protestant churches in the Netherlands